Anna University Chennai - Regional Campus, Madurai formerly Anna University of Technology, Madurai is a technological university located at Madurai, Tamil Nadu, India. It was established on 2010 as a result of a decision to split Anna University into six universities, namely, Anna University, Chennai, Anna University, Chennai - Taramani Campus, Anna University Chennai - Regional Office, Tiruchirappalli, Anna University Chennai - Regional Office, Coimbatore, Anna University Chennai - Regional Office, Tirunelveli and Anna University Chennai - Regional Office, Madurai. 
It is an accredited university with powers to grant affiliations to colleges and universities conducting graduate and post graduate studies, as well as diploma courses, and is also recognized by the University Grants Commission. Dr. R. Murugesan was the founding vice-chancellor and led a leadership team consisting of Dr. E.B. Perumal Pillai as the first registrar, Dr. G.Elangovan as controller of examinations), Dr. V. Malathi as director of academics, Dr. R. Subramaniam Pillai as director of admissions, Dr. T. Chitravel as director of research), Dr. S. Srinivasan as director of affiliations) and R. Sivaraman as deputy registrar administration.

The university had 46 affiliated colleges and three university campuses, at Madurai, Ramanathapuram and Dindigul.

After functioning for a brief period inside the premises of Madurai Kamaraj University, it is presently located on National Highway 7 at a sprawling campus at the serene and historic location of Keelakuilkudi in Madurai. Located on a hillock adjacent to the world famous Samanar Hills, it offers the right ambiance for the academic environment.

On 14 September 2011 a bill was passed to merge back the universities. Though the university was merged with Anna University Chennai, it still functions as the regional campus and offers BTech and MTech degree programmes.

See also
Education in India
Literacy in India
List of colleges and institutes in Madurai district
List of institutions of higher education in Tamil Nadu

References

External links
Official website

Engineering colleges in Tamil Nadu